Begnište is a village in the municipality of Kavadarci, North Macedonia.

Demographics
According to the statistics of the Bulgarian ethnographer Vasil Kanchov from 1900 the settlement is recorded as "Begništa" in which 860 inhabitants lived, all Cristian Bulgarians. On the 1927 ethnic map of Leonhard Schulze-Jena, the village is written as "Beglišta" and shown as a Christian Bulgarian village.According to the 2002 census, the village had a total of 369 inhabitants. Ethnic groups in the village include:

Macedonians 368
Serbs 1

Etymology 
The name of the village of Begnište derives from the combination of the word Beg which is the Turkic title for a chieftain, and the suffix (n)iste.

References 

Villages in Kavadarci Municipality